Conrad Albrizio (1894-1973) was an American muralist. Born in New York City, he was trained in France and Italy. He taught at Louisiana State University from 1936 to 1953, and he painted many murals in Louisiana.

Further reading

References

1894 births
1973 deaths
American muralists
Artists from New Orleans
Painters from New York City
Louisiana State University faculty
20th-century American painters
American expatriates in France
American expatriates in Italy
Public Works of Art Project artists
Section of Painting and Sculpture artists